Ulrich Wickert (born 2 December 1942) is a German journalist. He is one of the best-known broadcasters in Germany.

Early life 
Born in Tokyo, Japan, Wickert grew up in Heidelberg and Paris as a result of his father Erwin Wickert being employed with NATO as a German diplomat. In the 1960s, he studied law and political sciences at the University of Bonn. In 1962, he spent a year at Wesleyan University on a Fulbright scholarship.

After passing the first level of German bar exams in 1968, he started working as freelance radio producer for ARD, becoming a full-time editor there a short time later.

Career 
Between 1969 and 1977, Wickert was an editor for Monitor, a political affairs program produced by the WDR network. He was deployed as a correspondent for every French presidential election between 1969 and 1978. In 1978 he was made French correspondent and transferred to the Paris bureau of the ARD.

In 1981, he founded the discussion group "Journalists for Public Broadcasting"; in that same year he became chief correspondent of the ARD bureau in New York. In 1984 he became chief correspondent of the Paris ARD bureau.

From July 1991 to August 2006 he was chief anchor for tagesthemen, in alternation with Sabine Christiansen  (1991–1997), Gabi Bauer (1997–2001) and Anne Will (2001–2006). On 11 April 2004 he announced that he would not seek a renewal of his contract, which expired in 2006. On 1 September 2006 Wickert was succeeded by Washington D.C. bureau chief Tom Buhrow.

He was elevated to the French Légion d'honneur in 2005 for his service to French-German relations.

Wickert is in his third marriage, to Julia Jäkel, CEO of the publishing house Gruner + Jahr. He is the uncle of actress Emily Wood.

References

External links 

Interview with Ulrich Wickert: "Bunt und locker flockig reicht nicht" (in German, by sbznet.de)

1942 births
Living people
German male journalists
German television reporters and correspondents
German broadcast news analysts
20th-century German journalists
21st-century German journalists
University of Bonn alumni
Wesleyan University alumni
Officers Crosses of the Order of Merit of the Federal Republic of Germany
ARD (broadcaster) people
Westdeutscher Rundfunk people